This list of churches in Falster lists churches on the island of Falster, Denmark.

List

See also
 List of churches on Bornholm
 List of churches on Lolland

References

Falster